The Battle of Majaceite was fought in the First Carlist War.  Ramón María Narváez y Campos was ordered to intercept the expedition of the Carlist general Miguel Gómez Damas.  Narváez left Madrid in October 1836 with three divisions, while Gómez Damas left Ronda on November 18, 1836, entering Algeciras on November 22.

On November 23, when he departed Algeciras, Gómez Damas found himself surrounded at the citadel known as Alcalá de los Gazules.  Gómez Damas attempted to reach Arcos de la Frontera, but met Narváez's army at the Majaceite River.  The battle resulted with Gómez Damas’ withdrawal to Villamartín.  An English commentator wrote that “it was at Majaciete that [Narváez] rescued Andalucía from the Carlist invasion by a brilliant coup de main, in a rapid but destruction action, which will not readily be effaced from the memory of the southern provinces.”

References 

Majaceite
Majaceite
1836 in Spain
Majaceite
November 1836 events